"No Harm" is a single by British indie rock band, Editors. The song was the lead single off of their fifth studio album, In Dream, and was released through PIAS Recordings on 20 April 2015.

Style 
Andrew Tendell, writing for Gigwise called "No Harm" "a brooding, ominous and cinematic slow-burning" song. Describing it as a slow gothic and dark wave track.

Charts

References

External links

2015 songs
2015 singles
Editors (band) songs
Music videos directed by Rahi Rezvani
PIAS Recordings singles
Songs written by Edward Lay
Songs written by Russell Leetch
Songs written by Tom Smith (musician)
Songs written by Justin Lockey
Songs written by Elliott Williams